Maniche is a commune in the Les Cayes Arrondissement, in the Sud department of Haiti. It has 21,766 inhabitants.

The villages of Maniche and Madame Jean Pierre is located in the commune.

References

Populated places in Sud (department)
Communes of Haiti